The 193rd Pennsylvania House of Representatives District is located in Adams County and Cumberland County and includes the following areas:

 Adams County
Abbottstown
Arendtsville
Bendersville
Berwick Township
Biglerville
Butler Township
East Berlin
Hamilton Township
Huntington Township
Latimore Township
Menallen Township
New Oxford
 Adams County (continued)
Oxford Township
Reading Township
Tyrone Township
York Springs
 Cumberland County
Cooke Township
Mount Holly Springs
North Newton Township
Penn Township
South Middleton Township
South Newton Township

Representatives

References

Government of Adams County, Pennsylvania
Government of Cumberland County, Pennsylvania
193